Mount Soza is a massive mountain (2,190 m) in the Bowers Mountains that comprises the east wall of the Rennick Glacier between the entry points of the tributary Alt and Carryer Glaciers. Named by Advisory Committee on Antarctic Names (US-ACAN) after Ezekiel R. Soza, United States Geological Survey (USGS) topographic engineer, a member of USGS Topo North and South, 1961–62, and Topo East and West, 1962–63. Using Army turbine helicopters for rapid movement, these survey parties established geodetic control in the Transantarctic Mountains between the Cape Hallett area and Beardmore Glacier during the first season (Topo North and South); during the second season geodetic control was extended from Cape Hallett to Wilson Hills (Topo West), and from the foot of Beardmore Glacier through the Horlick Mountains (Topo East). Soza was leader of the USGS mapping party in the Pensacola Mountains, 1965–66 season.

External links 
 Mount Soza on USGS website
 Mount Soza on the Antarctica New Zealand Digital Asset Manager website
 Mount Soza on AADC website
 Mount Soza on SCAR website
 Mount Soza area map
 Mount Soza on peakery website

References 

Mountains of Victoria Land
Pennell Coast